Lara Pampín Beltrame (born 3 May 1995) is a field hockey player from Spain, who plays as a defender.

Career

Club hockey
Pampín plays hockey for SPV-Complutense in the División de Honor in Spain.

National teams

Under–21
In 2014, Pampín made her debut for the Spanish Under–21 team at the EuroHockey Junior Championship in Waterloo where the team finished fourth.

She followed this up with an appearance at the 2016 FIH Junior World Cup in Santiago.

Red Sticks
Pampín made her debut for the Spanish national team, the 'Red Sticks', in 2017.

In 2019, Pampín won her first medal with the national team at the FIH Series Finals in Valencia, taking home gold.

References

External links

1995 births
Living people
Female field hockey defenders
Spanish female field hockey players